Maurice Bellonte (Méru, Oise, 25 October 1896 – Paris, 14 January 1983) was a French aviator who set flight distance records. 

Associated with Dieudonné Costes, in 1930 he performed the first westbound crossing of the North Atlantic from Paris  to New York, on board the Breguet XIX Point d'interrogation.

References

1896 births
1983 deaths
People from Oise
French World War I pilots
Grand Croix of the Légion d'honneur
Burials at Passy Cemetery

French aviation record holders
Aviation pioneers